William Bernard Feldhaus (December 8, 1912 – June 2, 1974) was an American football player and coach. He played college football at Cincinnati and professional football for the Detroit Lions and held coaching positions at Miami (OH), Indiana, and Xavier.

Early years
A native of Cincinnati, Calvelli attended Hughes High School and then played college football as a tackle at the University of Cincinnati. While at the university, he also played varsity baseball and basketball.

Professional football
He also played professional football in the National Football League (NFL) for the Detroit Lions . He played as a guard for the Lions from 1937 to 1940, appearing in 43 games, 32 as a starter. He was known as an iron man football player who sat for less than 10 minutes per game. While playing with the Lions, he worked as an automobile salesman during the off-season.

Coaching and later years
During World War II, Feldhaus served in the U.S. Navy, including duty as a football coach at the pre-flight school in Athens, Georgia. He served as the line coach at the Xavier from 1947 to 1950. He also worked as an assistant coach at Miami University and Indiana University and held positions in the insurance business and on the sales staff of a Chevrolet dealer. He suffered a stroke in 1953 and was disabled after 1963. He died in 1974 at a Cincinnati nursing home.

References

1912 births
1974 deaths
American football guards
Cincinnati Bearcats football players
Detroit Lions players
Xavier Musketeers football coaches
Indiana Hoosiers football coaches
Miami RedHawks football coaches
Players of American football from Cincinnati